Bireswar (2013) is an experimental drama produced by Belgharia Shankhamala theatre group. The eventful life of Swami Vivekananda has been depicted in this drama.

Synopsis 

The drama attempts to cover the whole life of Swami Vivekananda.

Credits 
 Writer: Basab Dasgupta
 Direction and stage composition: Debesh Chattopadhyay
 Audio direction: Sumantra Sengupta
 Music: Srikanto Acharya and Sreejit Bhattacharya

See also 
 Biley

References 

Bengali theatre
Swami Vivekananda
Bengali-language plays